Francisco Antonio Rísquez (1856, Juan Griego –1941) was a Venezuelan physician.

1856 births
1941 deaths
19th-century Venezuelan physicians
Central University of Venezuela alumni
Members of the Venezuelan Chamber of Deputies
20th-century Venezuelan physicians